Jacquinot is a French surname. Notable people with the surname include:

Charles Jacquinot (1796–1879), French admiral and Antarctic explorer
Honoré Jacquinot (1815–1887), French surgeon and zoologist, brother of Charles-Hector
Louis Jacquinot (1898–1993), French lawyer and politician, several times minister
Robert Jacquinot (1893–1980), French road racing cyclist
Robert Jacquinot de Besange (1878-1946), French Jesuit

See also
Jacquinot Bay, bay in East New Britain Province
Jacquinot Bay Airport
Jacquinot Rocks, in Antarctica, named after Honoré Jacquinot
Mount Jacquinot, in Antarctica, named after Charles Jacquinot

French-language surnames